Poplar and Limehouse is a constituency created in 2010 and represented in the House of Commons of the UK Parliament since 2019 by Apsana Begum of the Labour Party. From its creation until 2019, it was represented by Jim Fitzpatrick, also of Labour.

History
Political history
The predecessors to this constituency (area electing MPs to the House of Commons) (see history of boundaries) since 1992 have elected Labour Party representatives. In 2010, Jim Fitzpatrick had a majority of 12.9% over the runner-up Conservative Party candidate.

The 2015 re-election of Fitzpatrick made the seat the 66th safest of Labour's 232 seats by percentage of majority.

In 2019, Apsana Begum, selected to succeed the retiring Fitzpatrick as Labour's candidate, beat the runner-up Conservative Party candidate by 28,904 votes. This was more than Jim Fitzpatrick’s 27,712 vote majority at the 2017 general election, though the majority size in terms of vote share remained stable at 47.2%, and Labour's vote share declined.

Boundaries

Parliament accepted the Boundary Commission's Fifth Periodic Review of Westminster constituencies which proposed the seat's creation for the 2010 general election, since when it has consisted of the following electoral wards:
Blackwall and Cubitt Town, Bromley-by-Bow, East India and Lansbury, Limehouse, Mile End East, Millwall, St Katharine’s and Wapping, and Shadwell within the London Borough of Tower Hamlets

History of boundaries
Before 2010, this constituency would map into all but the north-east of the old Poplar and Canning Town constituency, plus the western end of Shadwell Ward and in the west the whole of St Katharine's & Wapping Ward, formerly parts of Bethnal Green and Bow.
The areas of the old constituency that were in the London Borough of Newham were removed and transferred to East Ham (5.1% of Poplar and Canning Town) and West Ham (24.9%).
Nomenclature
Alternative names, including "Tower Hamlets South" and "Poplar and Millwall" were rejected following public consultation.

Constituency profile
The constituency and its predecessor seats covering the Isle of Dogs have consistently been won by the Labour Party since the 1920s. The district has changed vastly over this time, and great wealth and considerable poverty now co-exist side by side as an example of income inequality.

Once home to shipping and heavy industry, the Docklands area was derelict for many years, before redevelopment began in the late-1980s. Now the area around Canary Wharf is one of the country's largest financial districts and has several landmark skyscrapers, such as One Canada Square.

The redevelopment of the Docklands has led to the construction of luxury housing in the constituency, which has somewhat altered the demographics. However, in parts of the Isle of Dogs and in the areas north, east and west of Poplar, there are still areas of high deprivation.

At the end of 2012, 6% of the population of the constituency were unemployment benefit claimants, ranking sixth among London seats (the highest percentage was Tottenham at 7.9%), and above the London-wide average of 3.9%.

In the 2016 EU referendum, like the majority of London; the constituency voted 65.79% for Remain.

Members of Parliament

Elections

Elections in the 2010s 

* Served as an MP in the 2005–2010 Parliament

See also
List of parliamentary constituencies in London

Notes

References

External links 
Politics Resources (Election results from 1922 onwards)
Electoral Calculus (Election results from 1955 onwards)
Tim Archer
Jim Fitzpatrick
Jonathan Fryer
George Galloway
Andrew Osborne
Jim Thornton
Kabir Mahmud
Documentary on the 2010 election by Catch21

Limehouse
Parliamentary constituencies in London
Politics of the London Borough of Tower Hamlets
Poplar, London
Constituencies of the Parliament of the United Kingdom established in 2010